Maarten Biesheuvel (23 May 1939 in Schiedam – 30 July 2020 in Leiden) was a Dutch writer of short stories and novellas. He made his literary debut in 1972 with the short story collection In de bovenkooi. He received the "Ferdinand Bordewijk Prijs" in 1984 for Reis door mijn kamer. In 2007 he received the P. C. Hooft Award.

The Dutch  was named after him and is awarded to the author of the best collection of short stories that has appeared in the Dutch language during the previous year.

From 1990 Biesheuvel's literary production slowed significantly due to a writer's block and manic-depressive phases.

He died in July 2020.

Selected works
In de bovenkooi (1972) 
Reis door mijn kamer (1984) 
Godencirkel (1986)

Awards
1985: The Ferdinand Bordewijk Prijs for Reis door mijn kamer
2007: The P. C. Hooft Award
2008: Knight of the Order of the Netherlands Lion

References

1939 births
2020 deaths
20th-century Dutch novelists
20th-century Dutch male writers
People from Schiedam
Ferdinand Bordewijk Prize winners
P. C. Hooft Award winners
Dutch male novelists